The discography of American rock band Adema consists of four studio albums, three extended plays, eleven singles and seven music videos.

Albums

Studio albums

Extended plays

Singles

Music videos

Notes

References

External links
Official website
Adema at AllMusic

Discographies of American artists
Rock music group discographies